"I Can't Stop Loving You" is a popular song written and composed by country singer, songwriter, and musician Don Gibson, who first recorded it on December 3, 1957, for RCA Victor Records.  It was released in 1958 as the B-side of "Oh, Lonesome Me", becoming a double-sided country hit single. At the time of Gibson's death in 2003, the song had been recorded by more than 700 artists, most notably by Ray Charles, whose recording reached No. 1 on the Billboard chart.

Composition
Gibson wrote both "I Can't Stop Loving You" and "Oh, Lonesome Me" on June 7, 1957, in Knoxville, Tennessee. "I sat down to write a lost love ballad," Gibson said in Dorothy Horstman's 1975 book Sing Your Heart Out, Country Boy. "After writing several lines to the song, I looked back and saw the line 'I can't stop loving you.' I said, 'That would be a good title,' so I went ahead and rewrote it in its present form."

Charts
Note: This original recording was released as "I Can't Stop Lovin' You".

Ray Charles single

The song was covered by Ray Charles in 1962, featured on Charles' Modern Sounds in Country and Western Music, and released as a single. Charles' version reached number one on the Billboard Hot 100 in 1962, for five weeks.  This version went to number one on the U.S. R&B and Adult Contemporary charts. Billboard ranked it as the No. 2 song for 1962. Charles reached No. 1 in the UK Singles Chart in July 1962, staying for two weeks. In Sweden it was the first number one single on the sales chart Kvällstoppen on July 10, 1962.

The Ray Charles version is noted for his saying the words before the last five lines of the song on the final chorus: "Sing the song, children". Choral backing was provided by The Randy Van Horne Singers. It was ranked No. 164 on Rolling Stone's list of the 500 Greatest Songs of All Time and No. 49 on CMT's "100 Greatest Songs in Country Music".

This recording was featured in Metropolis (2001 film), where it can be heard during the explosion of the skyscraper Ziggurat shortly after the climax.

Charts

All-time charts

Other versions

The song has been recorded by many other artists. Some recordings are titled as "I Can't Stop Lovin' You" (with or without an apostrophe).

1958: Kitty Wells on her album Kitty Wells' Golden Favorites; No. 3 on the Billboard magazine country chart
1961: Roy Orbison on his album Sings Lonely and Blue; charted in the Variety magazine Top 100 Listings
1962: Ray Charles featured on Charles' Modern Sounds in Country and Western Music, and released as a single. 
1962: Count Basie's recording, a Quincy Jones arrangement, won the 1962 Grammy Award for "Best Instrumental Arrangement".
1962: Ray Anthony recorded the song for the album Ray Anthony Plays Worried Mind
1963: Johnny Tillotson on his album Talk Back Trembling Lips (MGM Records – E 4188)
1963: Paul Anka on his album Songs I Wish I'd Written (RCA Victor – LSP-2744)
1964: Faron Young on his album Country Dance Favorites (Mercury Records - SR 60931)
1964: Frank Sinatra recorded the song for his album It Might As Well Be Swing, his second collaboration with Count Basie and his orchestra 
1964: Jim Reeves on his last album The Jim Reeves Way which was released in 1965
1964: Ike & Tina Turner covered the song in 1964; released on their album Live! The Ike & Tina Turner Show in January 1965.
1965: Duke Ellington recorded the song for his album Ellington '66
1965: Andy Williams on his album Andy Williams' Dear Heart
1966: Pavel Novak, Czech singer
1967: Ronnie Dove on his LP Cry
1969: Elvis Presley performed the song live from 1969 until his final tours in 1977, first recording it on the RCA release Elvis in Person at the International Hotel, Las Vegas, Nevada
1969: Jerry Lee Lewis recorded it on the album Sings the Country Music Hall of Fame Hits, Vol. 2
Guy & Ralna included a recording of the song on their 1973 album Country Songs We Love to Sing; the duo also performed the song numerous times on The Lawrence Welk Show, on which they were regulars.
1972: Conway Twitty on his album of the same name; reached No. 1 on Billboard's Hot Country Singles chart
1974: Donna Hightower recorded in Spain it on her Columbia album "I'm In Love with Love" (also released as "I'm in Love with You" and "The One I Cried")
1974: Dolly Parton and Chet Atkins performed the song (to Atkins' guitar accompaniment) on The Porter Wagoner Show in 1974. 
1974: Johnny Rodriguez covered the song on his album "Songs About Ladies And Love". This version is notable as Rodriguez alternates between singing in English and Spanish throughout the song. 
1977: Sammi Smith covered the song for her Mixed Emotions album. The song also reached No. 27 on Billboard's Hot Country Singles chart.
1978: Mary K. Miller reached No. 28 on Billboard's Hot Country Singles chart.
1981: Rez Band recorded a cover as their closing track on the platinum-selling Mommy Don't Love Daddy Anymore, hitting the Christian Rock charts.
1981: Millie Jackson recorded an upbeat, disco-influenced version for her Just a Lil' Bit Country album. The song was also released as a single in the U.S. and charted #62 R&B.
1991: Van Morrison on his album Hymns to the Silence; also appears on a limited edition album Live at Austin City Limits Festival (2006)
2002: Anne Murray on her album Country Croonin'
2005: Martina McBride on her album Timeless
2014: Bryan Adams recorded a version for his album Tracks of My Years

References

1958 singles
1962 singles
1972 singles
1991 singles
Songs written by Don Gibson
Don Gibson songs
Kitty Wells songs
Roy Orbison songs
Ray Charles songs
Johnny Tillotson songs
Jim Reeves songs
Frank Sinatra songs
Duke Ellington songs
Elvis Presley songs
Song recordings produced by Owen Bradley
Number-one singles in Australia
Billboard Hot 100 number-one singles
Cashbox number-one singles
UK Singles Chart number-one singles
Grammy Hall of Fame Award recipients
ABC Records singles
Decca Records singles
Polydor Records singles
RCA Victor singles
Torch songs
1957 songs